La Fuerza is the debut solo and Spanish-language extended play (EP) by American singer Christina Aguilera. It was released through Sony Music Latin on January 21, 2022 as the first part of her ninth studio and second Spanish-language album Aguilera (2022). It is her second EP, following her promotional EP, Justin & Christina (2003), with Justin Timberlake. While recording her ninth studio album in Miami in early 2021, Aguilera decided to release the album in an unconventional way, by releasing it in three separate parts. La Fuerza was the first part of the trilogy. The EP is centered around female empowerment and strength and features guest vocals from Becky G, Nicki Nicole, Nathy Peluso, and Ozuna.

Three singles were released from the album: "Pa Mis Muchachas" with Becky G, Nicole and Peluso, "Somos Nada", and "Santo" with Ozuna. Upon release, the EP received positive reviews and debuted at number two on the US Latin Pop Albums. La Fuerza was rereleased as the first disc on Aguilera along with its followup, La Tormenta on May 31, 2022.

Background and recording 

In 2000, Aguilera released her second studio album Mi Reflejo, her first Spanish-language album, which went on to be ranked number ten on the Billboard'''s Top 20 Latin Albums of All Time and become the best selling Latin pop album of 2000. 

Aguilera began teasing the release of her second "overdue" Spanish-language album two decades later in late 2020, noting in a Health magazine interview in April 2021 that, "I'm months away from anything being announced [...] I am reinspired and have reconnected with myself. I've fallen in love with music all over again, which is a really big thing to say, having spent my entire career in music".

Aguilera noted that she took advantage of the COVID-19 pandemic to retreat to Miami, Florida in a COVID-safe writing camp with the intention to pay homage to her Ecuadorian heritage. The album was recorded over four weeks, with the first song recorded being the album's lead single, "Pa' Mis Muchachas". Aguilera further teased the release of the album in an interview with Insider in September 2021. Aguilera revealed that she planned to release the album "throughout the next year in sort of six song increments every few months". In an interview with the Los Angeles Times, Aguilera revealed that the album would be released in three pieces, confirming that the first part of the album would be titled La Fuerza and that it would celebrate her power as a woman. The full Spanish album, Aguilera was released on May 31, 2022 and features all of the songs from the EP La Fuerza as well as its follow-up La Tormenta.

Music and lyricsLa Fuerza is a Latin EP, influenced by dance-pop, piano ballads, ranchera, urbano music, cumbia, guaracha and reggaeton.

Singles

Three singles were released for the EP. These include "Pa Mis Muchachas", "Somos Nada", and "Santo".

Critical reception

Upon release, the EP received positive reviews from music critics. La Fuerza was named the best album of the week by Billboard Argentina. Reviewing the EP for Rolling Stone, Lucas Villa wrote that Aguilera's "vocal prowess is extraordinary in any language", and labelled its ballads as "highlights", considering "La Reina" the best song on the record. Billboard described La Fuerza as "not only an homage to her [Aguilera's] Latin roots but a project full of passion, innovation, exploration and, of course, powerhouse vocals." 

Josh Weiner, writing for Atwood Magazine, praised the EP for its quality and opined that La Fuerza "is nineteen minutes of excellent, fully-realized music", and cheered Aguilera for "embracing an exciting new artistic identity". Weiner concluded his review by claiming that "seeing the veteran performer shake things up so drastically in this late phase of her career is massively impressive". The music magazine later named La Fuerza one of the best EPs of 2022, stating that "her [Aguilera’s] powerful pipes continue to dazzle; even when she’s singing in her second language, it all sounded smooth, natural, and never forced". Pip Ellwood-Hughes of Entertainment Focus claimed that "hearing her [Aguilera] singing in Spanish again is a joy and this collection of songs is better than anything she’s released in years". Enrique Cerros from NEIU Independent gave La Fuerza a 5/5 score, and noted that it is "a successful comeback for Aguilera, and it can be considered her best work to date". The Tabs Harrison Brocklehurst applauded the EP for its "excellent Latin bangers" and for the reggaeton beats that help Aguilera's voice "truly soar".

Two songs from the EP, "Pa Mis Muchachas" and "Santo", were nominated for the Latin Grammy Awards. A ranchera titled "La Reina" was named one of the best Latin songs of 2022 by the Time magazine. Esquire placed La Fuerza on its list of the thirty-seven best albums of 2022.

Commercial performance
La Fuerza debuted at number two on the US Latin Pop Albums chart and at 14 on Top Latin Albums chart with 4,000 album-equivalent units sold of which 2,000 were pure album copies.

Track listingNotes'''
All songs co-produced by Afo Verde
All songs vocally produced by Jean Rodríguez

Personnel

Musicians
 Christina Aguilera – vocals
 Federico Vindver – arrangement, keyboards, programming (all tracks), percussion (2)
 JonTheProducer – arrangement, keyboards, programming (1)
 Rafa Arcaute – arrangement, keyboards, programming (all tracks); percussion (2)
 Jorge Luis Chacín – background vocals (2)
 Kat Dahlia – background vocals (2)
 Yasmil Marrufo – background vocals (2, 6); bass, guitar (6)
 Yoel Henríquez – background vocals (2)
 Matt Rollings – piano (3)
 DallasK – arrangement, keyboards, programming (4)
 Luigi Castillo – background vocals (6)
 Santiago Castillo – background vocals (6)
 Servando Primera – background vocals (6)

Technical
 Jaycen Joshua – mastering, mixing
 Federico Vindver – recording
 Jean Rodríguez – recording
 Rafa Arcaute – recording
 Ray Charles Brown, Jr. – recording
 José Aponte – recording (4)
 Yasmil Marrufo – recording (6)
 Felipe Trujillo – engineering assistance (1, 5)
 Morgan David – engineering assistance (1, 5)

Charts

Release history

References

Sony Music Latin EPs
EPs by American artists
Spanish-language EPs
Latin music EPs
Albums produced by Yasmil Marrufo
Albums produced by JonTheProducer
Christina Aguilera EPs